Serbia is set to participate in the Eurovision Song Contest 2023 in Liverpool, United Kingdom, with "" performed by Luke Black. The Serbian national broadcaster, Radio Television of Serbia (RTS), organised the national final  '23 in order to select the Serbian entry for the 2023 contest.

Background 

Serbia's , "In corpore sano" performed by Konstrakta, qualified to the final and placed fifth.

The Serbian national broadcaster, Radio Television of Serbia (RTS), broadcasts the event within Serbia and organises the selection process for the nation's entry. The broadcaster confirmed Serbia's participation in the 2023 contest in Liverpool on 25 August 2022. Between 2007 and 2009, Serbia used the Beovizija national final in order to select their entry. However, after their 2009 entry, "Cipela" performed by Marko Kon and Milaan, failed to qualify Serbia to the final, the broadcaster shifted their selection strategy to selecting specific composers to create songs for artists. In 2010, RTS selected Goran Bregović to compose songs for a national final featuring three artists, while in 2011 Kornelije Kovač, Aleksandra Kovač and Kristina Kovač were tasked with composing one song each. In 2012, the internal selection of Željko Joksimović and the song "Nije ljubav stvar" secured the country's second highest placing in the contest to this point, placing third. In 2013, RTS returned to an open national final format and organized the Beosong competition. The winning entry, "Ljubav je svuda" performed by Moje 3, failed to qualify Serbia to the final. In 2015, RTS selected Vladimir Graić, the composer of Serbia's 2007 winning entry "Molitva", to compose songs for a national final featuring three artists. RTS internally selected the Serbian entries in 2016 and 2017 with the decision made by RTS music editors. In 2018 and 2019, RTS returned to using the Beovizija national final in order to select their entry, managing to qualify to the final on both occasions. In 2022, RTS returned to organising a national final under the name  '22. On 1 September 2022, RTS confirmed that  would be organised for a second time in order to select the country's entry to the 2023 contest.

Before Eurovision

Pesma za Evroviziju '23 

 '23 was the national final organised by RTS to select the Serbian entry for the Eurovision Song Contest 2023. The selection consisted of two semi-finals held on 1 and 2 March 2023, respectively, and a final on 4 March 2023. All events took place at the Studios 8 and 9 of RTS in Košutnjak, Belgrade. Eight acts qualified to the final from each semi-final resulting in a 16-participant final. "" performed by Luke Black emerged as the winner.

At Eurovision 
According to Eurovision rules, all nations with the exceptions of the host country and the "Big Five" (France, Germany, Italy, Spain and the United Kingdom) are required to qualify from one of two semi-finals in order to compete for the final; the top 10 countries from each semi-final progress to the final. The European Broadcasting Union (EBU) split up the competing countries into six different pots based on voting patterns from previous contests, with countries with favourable voting histories put into the same pot. On 31 January 2023, an allocation draw was held, which placed each country into one of the two semi-finals, and determined which half of the show they would perform in. Serbia has been placed into the first semi-final, to be held on 9 May 2023, and has been scheduled to perform in the first half of the show.

References 

Countries in the Eurovision Song Contest 2023
2023
Eurovision